Echizen ware (越前焼, Echizen-yaki) is a type of Japanese pottery traditionally produced in Echizen, Odacho and Miyazaki Fukui Prefecture.

It is considered one of the Six Ancient Kilns of Japan.

The Echizen Pottery Village showcases a wide variety of this pottery style.

References

External links 

 
 
 
  

Culture in Fukui Prefecture
Japanese pottery